The Communist Platform (KP) is a political platform and organization in Norway formed after the dissolution of the old Workers' Communist Party (AKP) on March 10, 2007 and its decision to merge into the new "broader" party Red.

KP's goal is to form a new communist party in Norway.

The platform convened its first annual assembly and elected a new leadership in February 2008.

References

External links
 Official website

2007 establishments in Norway
Communist parties in Norway
Political parties established in 2007